William Bull II (September 24, 1710 – July 4, 1791) was a landowner who was for many years (1759–1775) the lieutenant governor of the province of South Carolina and served as acting governor on five occasions. A Loyalist, he left the colony in 1782 when British troops were evacuated at the end of the American Revolutionary War, and he died in London.

William (Guilielmus) Bull matriculated at the University of Leiden in the Netherlands 10 October 1732. He received his Medical Doctor degree from the University of Leiden on 13 April 1734. The title description of his thesis is: Dissertatio medica inauguralis de colica pictonum. Quam … pro gradu Doctoratus, summisque in Medicina honoribus & privilegiis rite ac legitime consequendis, eruditorum examini submittit Guilielmus Bull … ad diem 18. Augusti 1734. hora locoque solitis. - Lugduni Batavorum  : apud Gerardum Potvliet, 1734. - 19,[1]p. ; 4to.

On title-page he is described as "Anglus ex Carolina." Dedicated to his father, William Bull, King's Counsel of South Carolina. In the thesis, he makes reference to "Townium Anglium qui ad colicam refert." Born in South Carolina, 1710, he is said to have been the first from the American Continent to graduate at Leyden. But Roland Cotton (born Hampton, N.H., August 29, 1674) received his Ph.D. at the University of Harderwijk in the Netherlands on October 8, 1697.

References

The South Carolina Historical Society Magazine

Loyalists in the American Revolution from South Carolina
British North American Anglicans
Colonial governors of South Carolina
Colonial South Carolina
Colonial United States (British)
People from Charleston County, South Carolina
People of pre-statehood South Carolina
South Carolina colonial people
Regulator Movement
18th-century American Episcopalians
1760s in the Thirteen Colonies
1710 births
1791 deaths
Leiden University alumni